Neutal is a town in the district of Oberpullendorf in the Austrian state of Burgenland.

Population

References

Cities and towns in Oberpullendorf District